Zoganj is a village in the municipality of Ulcinj, Montenegro.

Name
The name comes from the Albanian word "zog" meaning bird.

Demographics
According to the 2011 census, its population was 397.

References

Populated places in Ulcinj Municipality
Albanian communities in Montenegro